Kurevino is a rural locality (a village) in Zavrazhskoye Rural Settlement, Nikolsky District, Vologda Oblast, Russia. The population was 43 as of 2002.

Geography 
Kurevino is located 37 km southeast of Nikolsk (the district's administrative centre) by road. Tokovitsa is the nearest rural locality.

References 

Rural localities in Nikolsky District, Vologda Oblast